Carnegie is a borough in Allegheny County, Pennsylvania, United States, and is part of the Pittsburgh metropolitan area. The population was 8,134 in the 2020 census.

Geography
Chartiers Creek runs through the center of the borough and one tributary, Campbells Run, joins Chartiers Creek here.

Surrounding communities
Carnegie has four borders, including Rosslyn Farms to the north, Scott Township to the east, south and southwest, Collier Township to the west, and Robinson Township to the northwest.

History
Carnegie is named after Andrew Carnegie, who donated one of his libraries for the gesture. It was incorporated on March 1, 1894, from the boroughs of Chartiers and Mansfield (separated by Chartiers Creek). Later, the borough annexed part of Robinson Township (now Rosslyn Heights). Neighborhoods include Rosslyn Heights, Cubbage Hill, Irishtown, Forsythe Hill, Library Hill, and Old Mansfield.

Many neighborhoods were at one time or another SKRT mined for coal. The main employers were steel mills such as Superior Steel & Union Electric Steel. Carnegie had a rail yard that had connections to several railroads early in the twentieth century, including the Wabash Pittsburgh Terminal railroad, and the Pennsylvania Railroad.

On August 25, 1923, an estimated 10,000–30,000 members of the Ku Klux Klan (from surrounding areas) marched there to celebrate a so-called "Karnegie Day" and target the heavily-Catholic town's residents. The march was resisted by local residents, resulting in a riot which left injuries on both sides and the death of a Klansman.

In the 1970s, Carnegie suffered economically with the closure of the great steel mills such as J & L in and around Pittsburgh.

In 2004, Carnegie was significantly damaged by flooding as a result of Hurricane Ivan. Much of the commercial section of the borough, as well as the borough's Roman Catholic churches, was closed or damaged. But since 2014, Carnegie's Main Street has rebounded with many new restaurants and small businesses.

Culture
Carnegie is a walkable community with many interesting and unique stores and restaurants on its Main Street.  Its park is home to a dog park, playground, tennis courts, a hockey rink, basketball courts, baseball fields, walking trails, and Pitcher Skate Park. The Andrew Carnegie Free Library & Music Hall is home to the Grand Army of the Republic Cpt. Thomas Espy Post and Stage 62 theater productions.  Off the Wall Productions theater also makes its home in Carnegie, and hosts the annual Pittsburgh New Works Festival.

Carnegie is religiously diverse. There are two Orthodox Churches (Ukrainian and Russian), two Lutheran churches, a Ukrainian Catholic church, a Methodist church, an Episcopal church, a Polish Catholic church, a Roman Catholic Church (formerly 4), and a synagogue. In addition, the Attawheed Islamic Center opened in 2011, and the Indian Community Center in 2012.

Carnegie also has many local fraternal organizations including the VFW, FOE, American Legion, Elks, Polish Eagles, Polish Sportsmen, AOH, Ukrainian-American Citizens' Club, plus a number of smaller clubs.

Government and politics

Education

Carnegie's students are served by the Carlynton School District.  There is an elementary school within the Borough.

Demographics

As of the census of 2000, there were 8,389 people, 3,967 households, and 2,134 families residing in the borough. The population density was 5,076.7 people per square mile (1,963.0/km2). There were 4,249 housing units at an average density of 2,571.3 per square mile (994.3/km2). The racial makeup of the borough was 91.32% White, 5.57% African American, 0.08% Native American, 1.23% Asian, 0.05% Pacific Islander, 0.39% from other races, and 1.36% from two or more races. Hispanic or Latino of any race were 0.99% of the population.

There were 3,967 households, out of which 22.7% had children under the age of 18 living with them, 37.4% were married couples living together, 13.2% had a female householder with no husband present, and 46.2% were non-families. 40.4% of all households were made up of individuals, and 18.3% had someone living alone who was 65 years of age or older. The average household size was 2.10 and the average family size was 2.86.

In the borough the population was spread out, with 19.4% under the age of 18, 8.1% from 18 to 24, 30.4% from 25 to 44, 22.0% from 45 to 64, and 20.1% who were 65 years of age or older. The median age was 40 years. For every 100 females, there were 85.0 males. For every 100 females age 18 and over, there were 81.0 males.

The median income for a household in the borough was $32,589, and the median income for a family was $41,371. Males had a median income of $30,792 versus $26,239 for females. The per capita income for the borough was $21,119. About 9.7% of families and 11.5% of the population were below the poverty line, including 19.4% of those under age 18 and 7.2% of those age 65 or over.

Notable people

Athletes
Mike Ditka, Pro Football Hall of Fame member 
Bernie Faloney, Canadian Football Hall of Fame member
Skip Prosser, Former NCAA Division I basketball head coach for Wake Forest University
Butts Wagner, Major League Baseball player, older brother of Honus Wagner
Honus Wagner, Baseball Hall of Fame member

Politicians
Ruggero J. Aldisert, judge on the United States Court of Appeals
James H. Duff, governor of Pennsylvania, 1947–1951; member of the U.S. Senate, 1951–1957
James A. Wright, member of the U.S. House of Representatives, 1941–1945

Artists
James Michael Newell, W.P.A. muralist
Brian Alfred, Painter, Animator and Podcast Host

See also
 Polish Cathedral style
 Polish American

Gallery

References

External links

 Borough of Carnegie (official site)
 
 
 Historical Society of Carnegie & genealogy site
 Fraternal Order of Eagles
 Andrew Carnegie Free Library
 Government - Allegheny County

Andrew Carnegie
Populated places established in 1894
Pittsburgh metropolitan area
Boroughs in Allegheny County, Pennsylvania
1894 establishments in Pennsylvania